Perfect Strangers is a 2004 British romantic comedy film starring Rob Lowe and Anna Friel.

Plot summary
Lloyd and Susie in London work for the same ad agency, but in different cities. An arrangement is made where they switch jobs and homes for a month. After settling into each other's place they consult each other by phone. It's not long before they fall in love.

Cast
 Rob Lowe as Lloyd Rockwell
 Anna Friel as Susie Wilding
 Khandi Alexander as Christie Kaplan
 Sarah Alexander as Alix Mason
 Jennifer Baxter as Betsy
 Gabriel Hogan as Harvey Truelove
 Jane Luk as Dee Dee
 Colin Fox as Sir Nigel
 Katie Bergin as Kathy

References

External links
 
 
 
 

2004 television films
2004 films
2004 romantic comedy films
British romantic comedy films
CBS network films
Working Title Films films
2000s British films
British comedy television films